Love Makes No Sense is the fifth studio album by American recording artist Alexander O'Neal. The album was O'Neal's final release for Tabu, and his first album made without formal production from Jimmy Jam and Terry Lewis.

Sales of the album were not as strong as O'Neal's earlier releases; it went on to peak at number 89 on the US Billboard 200 and reached number 18 on Top R&B/Hip-Hop Albums. The album launched three charting singles in the United Kingdom: "Love Makes No Sense" peaked at number 26 on the UK Singles Chart; "In the Middle" peaked at number 32; "All That Matters to Me" peaked at number 67. It was O'Neal's first album not to be certified by the BPI, since his 1988 Christmas album, My Gift to You.

Love Makes No Sense was re-released in 2013 on Tabu's new Re-born imprint, featuring rare bonus content. The reissue is a two-CD set with the original album digitally remastered from the original half-inch mix tapes; the bonus content consists of associated 7-inch and 12-inch mixes.

Track listing

Note
 Track 11 included on some European and Japanese versions only.

Personnel
Credits are adapted from the album's liner notes.

Alexander O'Neal – lead and background vocals
Cherrelle – lead and background vocals
JayDee Mannes – steel guitar; pedal
Paul Jackson Jr. – guitars
Charles Fearing – guitars
Kevin Pierce – guitars
Dean Parks – acoustic guitar
Ed Greene – drums; tambourine
Bernard Purdie – drums
Christopher Troy – drum programming; piano; keyboards; Moog synthesizer; percussion
Zac Harmon – drum programming; keyboards; percussion
Lance Alexander – drum programming; keyboards; percussion
Jon Nettlesbey – drum programming; percussion
Khris Kellow – Wurlitzer electric piano
Bob Glaub – bass guitar
Freddie Washington – bass guitar
Steve Lindsey – organ; piano; synthesizer
Terry Coffey – synthesizer; keyboards
Enrico De Paoli – synthesizer
Randy Kerber – synthesizer
Booker T. Jones – organ
David Paich – organ
Jim Cox – piano
John Barnes – piano
Derrick Edmondson – saxophone
Brandon Fields – saxophone
M.G. – finger snaps
Franklin Wharton – flute
Lenny Castro – percussion
Oren Waters – backing vocals
Prof T. – backing vocals
Alex Brown – backing vocals
Barrington Scott – backing vocals
Carrie Harrington – backing vocals
Jackie Gouche – backing vocals
Jamecia Bennett – backing vocals
Joey Diggs – backing vocals
Joey Elias – backing vocals
Julia Tillman Waters – backing vocals
Maxine Willard Waters – backing vocals
Sean Devereaux – backing vocals
Tony Warren – backing vocals
Valerie Davis – backing vocals

Chart performance

Weekly charts

Release history

References

External links

Alexander O'Neal albums
1993 albums
Tabu Records albums